Atlético de Madrid had a largely disappointing season, where the club stalled in its progress towards the internationally qualifying positions. Despite Fernando Torres continuing to score more than a dozen goals per season, consolidating his status as Spain's top young striker, Atlético were only able to score 40 league goals. That rendered the successful defence of Luis Perea and Pablo Ibáñez vital just to keep the club in mid-table.

Squad

Goalkeepers
  Leo Franco
  Sergio
  Iván Cuéllar

Defenders
  Juan Velasco
  Antonio López
  García Calvo
  Santi
  Luis Perea
  Pablo Ibáñez
  Francisco Molinero
  Pablo Sicilia

Midfielders
  Gonzalo Colsa
  Marcelo Sosa
  Kiki Musampa
  Jorge Larena
  Diego Simeone
  Carlos Aguilera
  Nano
  Ariel Ibagaza
  Jesper Grønkjær
  Peter Luccin
  Raúl Medina

Attackers
  Veljko Paunović
  Richard Núñez
  Fernando Torres
  Salva
  Álvaro Novo
  Braulio

Captain
  Fernando Torres

Competitions

La Liga

League table

Matches
Atlético Madrid–Málaga 2-0
 1-0 Juan Calatayud 
 2-0 Fernando Torres 
Albacete–Atlético Madrid 0-2
 0-1 Fernando Torres 
 0-2 Ariel Ibagaza 
Atlético Madrid–Barcelona 1-1
 0-1 Giovanni van Bronckhorst 
 1-1 Fernando Torres 
Levante–Atlético Madrid 1-0
 1-0 Alberto Rivera 
Atlético Madrid–Villarreal 1-0
 1-0 Salva 
Real Sociedad–Atlético Madrid 1-0
 1-0 Darko Kovačević 
Atlético Madrid–Racing Santander 1-0
 1-0 Fernando Torres 
Sevilla–Atlético Madrid 2-1
 1-0 Aitor Ocio 
 2-0 Júlio Baptista 
 2-1 Pablo Ibáñez 
Valencia–Atlético Madrid 1-1
 1-0 Angulo 
 1-1 Fernando Torres 
Atlético Madrid–Real Zaragoza 1-1
 0-1 Sávio 
 1-1 Salva 
Mallorca–Atlético Madrid 1-1
 1-0 Juan Arango 
 1-1 Gonzalo Colsa 
Atlético Madrid–Numancia 2-0
 1-0 Pablo Ibáñez 
 2-0 Fernando Torres 
Espanyol–Atlético Madrid 2-1
 1-0 Dani 
 1-1 Nano 
 2-1 Dani 
Atlético Madrid–Osasuna 3-2
 1-0 Fernando Torres 
 2-0 Salva 
 2-1 Valdo 
 3-1 Gonzalo Colsa 
 3-2 Richard Morales 
Athletic Bilbao–Atlético Madrid 1-0
 1-0 Asier Del Horno 
Atlético Madrid–Deportivo 1-0
 1-0 Antonio López 
Betis–Atlético Madrid 1-0
 1-0 Joaquín 
Atlético Madrid–Real Madrid 0-3
 0-1 Ronaldo 
 0-2 Santiago Solari 
 0-3 Ronaldo 
Getafe–Atlético Madrid 1-1
 0-1 Jorge Larena 
 1-1 Sergio Pachón 
Málaga–Atlético Madrid 1-0
 1-0 Juan Rodríguez 
Atlético Madrid–Albacete 3-1
 0-1 Francisco 
 1-1 Fernando Torres 
 2-1 Ariel Ibagaza 
 3-1 Pablo Ibáñez 
Barcelona–Atlético Madrid 0-2
 0-1 Fernando Torres 
 0-2 Fernando Torres 
Atlético Madrid–Levante 0-0
Villarreal–Atlético Madrid 3-2
 0-1 Fernando Torres 
 0-2 Fernando Torres 
 1-2 Diego Forlán 
 2-2 Luis Perea 
 3-2 Juan Pablo Sorín 
Atlético Madrid–Real Sociedad 1-0
 1-0 Antonio López 
Racing Santander–Atlético Madrid 2-1
 0-1 Fernando Torres 
 1-1 Mario Regueiro 
 2-1 David Aganzo 
Atlético Madrid–Sevilla 3-0
 1-0 Salva 
 2-0 Fernando Torres 
 3-0 Antonio López 
Atlético Madrid–Valencia 1-0
 1-0 Fernando Torres 
Real Zaragoza–Atlético Madrid 0-0
Atlético Madrid–Mallorca 4-0
 1-0 Gonzalo Colsa 
 2-0 Fernando Torres 
 3-0 Salva 
 4-0 Salva 
Numancia–Atlético Madrid 1-0
 1-0 Toché 
Atlético Madrid–Espanyol 0-0
Osasuna–Atlético Madrid 1-0
 1-0 John Aloisi 
Atlético Madrid–Athletic Bilbao 1-1
 0-1 Joseba Etxeberría 
 1-1 Gonzalo Colsa 
Deportivo–Atlético Madrid 2-0
 1-0 Peter Luccin 
 2-0 Joan Capdevila 
Atlético Madrid–Betis 1-2
 0-1 Ricardo Oliveira 
 0-2 Ricardo Oliveira 
 1-2 Melli 
Real Madrid–Atlético Madrid 0-0
Atlético Madrid–Getafe 2-2
 0-1 David Cubillo 
 1-1 Richard Núñez 
 1-2 Gheorghe Craioveanu 
 2-2 Richard Núñez

Top scorers

La Liga
  Fernando Torres 16
  Salva 5
  Gonzalo Colsa 4
  Pablo Ibáñez 3

Atlético Madrid seasons
Atletico Madrid